South Carolina Highway 362 (SC 362) is a  state highway in the U.S. state of South Carolina. The highway connects Williams and Bamberg.

Route description
SC 362 begins at an intersection with SC 212 (Joel Padgett Street) in Williams, Colleton County. It travels to the northwest and immediately curves to the west-northwest before leaving the city limits. The highway crosses over Hog Branch before curving to a northwesterly direction. Then, it curves to the north-northwest. It begins a concurrency with SC 217 (Lodge Highway). The two highways head to the west and enter Bamberg County before they split. SC 362 travels to the north before resuming its north-northwestern routing. It passes Little Swamp Cemetery. Then, it curves to the north-northeast and eventually to the northeast. It curves back to the north-northwest and crosses Hurricane Branch and Drawdy Branch. The highway curves to the northwest. Then, it curves to a nearly due north direction before heading back to the north-northwest and northwest. It enters the eastern part of Bamberg, where it meets its northern terminus, an intersection with U.S. Route 78 (US 78; Heritage Highway).

Major intersections

See also

References

External links

SC 362 South Carolina Hwy Index

362
Transportation in Colleton County, South Carolina
Transportation in Bamberg County, South Carolina